The 1983 Campionati Internazionali di Sicilia, also known as the Sicilian Open, was a men's tennis tournament played on outdoor clay courts in Palermo, Italy that was part of the 1983 Volvo Grand Prix. It was the fifth edition of the tournament and took place from 12 September until 18 September 1983. Second-seeded Jimmy Arias won the singles title.

Finals

Singles
 Jimmy Arias defeated  José Luis Clerc 3–6, 6–1, 6–3
 It was Arias' 4th singles title of the year and the 5th and last of his career.

Doubles
 Pablo Arraya /  José Luis Clerc defeated  Danie Visser /  Tian Viljoen 1–6, 6–4, 6–4

References

External links
 ITF tournament edition details

Campionati Internazionali di Sicilia
Campionati Internazionali di Sicilia
Campionati Internazionali di Sicilia